The Chimor-Inca War was a conflict fought in the late 15th century between the Inca Empire and the Chimor Empire of coastal Peru. At the time of the conflict, the Chimor Empire was in a process of territorial expansion, but as the Inca Empire appeared in the picture, it became impossible for the Chimor to consolidate its conquests. Early skirmishes occurred when the Inca Empire conquered the non-Chimor inland city of Cajamarca. The Incas led by Topa Inca Yupanqui responded to hostilities by advancing first north to Quito in modern Ecuador and then turning their attention to the Chimor Empire. The Chimor Empire was likely conquered from the north. Once conquered, the Incas established an indirect rule over the Chimor. To consolidate victory the Incas pressured the Chimor to hand over the unruly Chimor cacique Minchançaman who travelled to Cuzco becoming a "luxury prisoner" while his more collaborative son acceded his position in his homeland.

References

15th century in Peru
1470s conflicts
Battles involving the Inca Empire
Pre-Columbian warfare